A cultural artifact, or cultural artefact (see American and British English spelling differences), is a term used in the social sciences, particularly anthropology, ethnology and sociology for anything created by humans which gives information about the culture of its creator and users.  Artifact is the spelling in North American English; artefact is usually preferred elsewhere.  

Cultural artifact is a more generic term and should be considered with two words of similar, but narrower, nuance: it can include objects recovered from archaeological sites, i.e. archaeological artifacts, but can also include objects of modern or early-modern society, or social artifacts. For example, in an anthropological context: a 17th-century lathe, a piece of faience, or a television each provides a wealth of information about the time in which they were manufactured and used.

Cultural artifacts, whether ancient or current, have a significance because they offer an insight into: technological processes, economic development and social structure, among other attributes.

Classification
The philosopher Marx W. Wartofsky categorised artifacts as follows:
 primary artifacts: used in production (such as a hammer, a fork, a lamp or a camera);
 secondary artifacts: relating to primary artifacts (such as a user-manual for a camera);
 tertiary artifacts: representations of secondary artifacts (such as a picture of a user-manual for a camera).

Social artifacts, unlike archaeological artifacts, do not need to have a physical form (for example virtual artifact), nor to be of historical value (items created seconds ago can be classified as social artifacts).

See also 
 Art object
 Cultural expressions
 Cultural heritage
 Cultural icon
 Cultural property
 Biofact
 Meme
 Mentifact

References

Further reading 
 Habib, Laurence, and Line Wittek (2007). The portfolio as artifact and actor. Mind, Culture and Activity, Vol. 14, No. 4, .

External links 
 

Anthropology
Museology
Artifact
Artifact